Paul Marantz is an American architectural lighting designer, whose work includes the discothèque Studio 54, the Times Square Ball, the Tribute in Light, the Barnes Foundation,
and the Burj Khalifa. He is a founder of the lighting design firm Fisher Marantz Stone.

Education and early career 

Marantz received a B.A. from Oberlin College and did graduate work at Case Western Reserve University and Brooklyn College. In 1968, he established an architectural lighting design firm with Jules Fisher.

Awards and honors 

Marantz has received numerous Lumen Citations from the Illuminating Engineering Society of North America (IES) for projects including the J. Paul Getty Museum, the restoration of Radio City Music Hall, the Times Square Ball, the Museum of Fine Arts, Houston, and the Byzantine Fresco Chapel. He received the International Association of Lighting Designers (IALD) Award for Excellence for the Islamic Cultural Center of New York and the San Francisco Museum of Modern Art, and he received an IALD Citation for the restoration of the Rainbow Room. New York Times architecture critic Herbert Muschamp described Marantz as a “lighting genius.”

Selected projects 

 Barnes Foundation
 Burj Khalifa
 Byzantine Fresco Chapel
 Carnegie Hall Restoration
 Grand Central Terminal Restoration
 Islamic Cultural Center of New York
 Miho Museum
 New York Public Library, Rose Main Reading Room Restoration
 Reflecting Absence, The National September 11 Memorial  
 Studio 54
 Times Square Ball
 Lighting standards for the redevelopment of Times Square
 Tribute in Light

References

External links 
 Fisher Marantz Stone, Official Website

Living people
Oberlin College alumni
Lighting designers
Year of birth missing (living people)
Brooklyn College alumni